Heidi Campbell is an American music publisher and politician from Tennessee. A Democrat, Campbell has represented the 20th district of the Tennessee Senate, covering the inner suburbs of Nashville, since 2020.

Campbell was first elected in 2020, narrowly winning the Democratic primary before defeating two-term Republican incumbent Steven Dickerson, 51.7% to 48.3%. Before running for the Senate, she served as mayor of Oak Hill, a small suburb south of Nashville from 2014 to 2020. Campbell is a music marketing director and has owned her own music publishing company since 1995.

In April 2022, Campbell announced her candidacy for Tennessee's 5th congressional district after incumbent Jim Cooper chose to retire. She did not have to give up her state senate seat to run for Congress; Tennessee state senators serve staggered four-year terms, and Campbell is not up for reelection until 2024.

Electoral history

References

External links
 Hedi Campbell for Congress campaign website
 Senator Heidi Campbell official legislative website

21st-century American politicians
21st-century American women politicians
Candidates in the 2022 United States House of Representatives elections
Living people
People from Davidson County, Tennessee
Democratic Party Tennessee state senators
Women state legislators in Tennessee
Year of birth missing (living people)
Women mayors of places in Tennessee
American music publishers (people)